René Charles de Maupeou (11 June 1688 – 4 April 1775) was a French politician, and chancellor of France during King Louis XV reign.

Biography
He was born in Paris on 11 June 1688 to a family ennobled in the sixteenth century as noblesse de robe : the house of Maupeou. He died on 4 April 1775.

He is the father of René Nicolas Charles Augustin de Maupeou.

1688 births
1775 deaths
Chancellors of France
17th-century French politicians
18th-century French politicians
French nobility